St Martin at Palace Plain, Norwich is a Grade I listed redundant parish church in the Church of England in Norwich.

History

The church is medieval but was heavily restored in the mid nineteenth century by Edward Hakewill. After being made redundant, the church was reused by the Norfolk Probation Service.

Burials

Edmund Sheffield, 1st Baron Sheffield

Organ

The church purchased an organ dating from 1863 by Corps and Son. A specification of the organ can be found on the National Pipe Organ Register. The organ was transferred to St Mary and St Andrew's Church, Horsham St Faith, Norwich in 1973.

References

Martin
Grade I listed churches in Norfolk